Philip Paul Blazer (born February 25, 1936) is a former American football offensive guard. He played college football at the University of North Carolina, and played professionally in the American Football League (AFL) for the Buffalo Bills in 1960.

See also
 List of American Football League players

1936 births
Living people
Players of American football from Pennsylvania
People from Homestead, Pennsylvania
American football offensive guards
North Carolina Tar Heels football players
Buffalo Bills players
American Football League players